Chaloem Phra Kiat is a district (amphoe) of Nakhon Si Thammarat province, southern Thailand.

History
The district was created on 5 December 1996, together with four other districts named Chaloem Phra Kiat in celebration of the 50th anniversary of King Bhumibol Adulyadej's accession to the throne.

The district was composed of three tambons: Chian Khao, Don Tro, and Suan Luang of Chian Yai district and tambon Thang Phun from Ron Phibun.

Geography
Neighboring districts are (from the north clockwise): Phra Phrom, Mueang Nakhon Si Thammarat, Pak Phanang, Chian Yai, Cha-uat, and Ron Phibun.

Administration
The district is divided into four sub-districts (tambons), which are further subdivided into 37 villages (mubans). There are no municipal (thesaban) areas, and four tambon administrative organizations (TAO).

References

External links
amphoe.com

Districts of Nakhon Si Thammarat province